CFSI, CfSi or cfsi may refer to:
 Community and Family Services International
 Counterfeit, fraudulent, and suspect items
 Culver's Franchising System, Inc., a fast-casual restaurant chain, headquartered in Prairie du Sac, Wisconsin.
 The Center for Financial Services Innovation, a non-profit think tank serving the underbanked, headquartered in Chicago, Illinois
 The Children's Film Society of India, an Indian governmental organisation